The Wrecker (1892) is an ocean adventure novel written by Robert Louis Stevenson in collaboration with his stepson Lloyd Osbourne that was used  sixty-five years later as the basis for an episode of the television series Maverick (1957) starring James Garner and Jack Kelly (see below).

Plot

The story is a "sprawling, episodic adventure story, a comedy of brash manners and something of a detective mystery", according to Roderick Watson. It revolves around the abandoned wreck of the Flying Scud at Midway Atoll. Clues in a stamp collection are used to track down the missing crew and solve the mystery. It is only in the last chapter that different story elements  become linked. 
Stevenson described it as a "South Sea yarn" concerning "a very strange and defective plan that was accepted with open eyes for what seemed countervailing opportunities offered". The book sold well but reviews were mixed, with a New York Times reviewer concluding that:

The loosely connected stories reflect how Stevenson and Osbourne wrote the book. Each contributed different sections, but agreed to develop characters and descriptions of places they both knew well. The following are examples:

 The schooner Equator (1888–1953) inspired the story. Its remains are preserved in a shed at Marina Park at the Port of Everett, Washington.
 Jack Buckland was a handsome, happy-go-lucky fellow passenger with Osbourne and Stevenson on the 1890 Janet Nicholl voyage. He inspired the character of "Remittance Man" Tommy Hadden.

Maverick adaptation
 (1957)]]
"The Wrecker" is an episode of Roy Huggins' 1957 Western television series Maverick (1957) starring James Garner and Jack Kelly as Bret and Bart Maverick. The episode is described in the opening title credit as "Robert Louis Stevenson's The Wrecker" and in the closing credits as "From a Novel by Robert Louis Stevenson & Lloyd Osbourne". The Maverick brothers buy the wreck of the Flying Scud at a closed auction in San Francisco and try to find out why its cargo is apparently so valuable, prompting Bart to venture into a dangerous sea voyage during the second half of the episode. The supporting cast features Errol Flynn lookalike Patric Knowles as the character inspired by Jack Buckland and Karl Swenson as a colorful sea captain. "The Wrecker" is the eleventh episode of the first season of the series.

See also
 List of Maverick episodes

References

External links
 
 

1892 British novels
Novels by Robert Louis Stevenson
Scottish novels
Midway Atoll
British novels adapted into television shows
Collaborative novels